The College of Liberal Arts and Social Sciences (CLASS) is the liberal arts college of Savannah State University. The college offers Bachelor of Arts degrees with concentrations in Africana studies, English language and literature (religious and philosophical studies or foreign language), history, or mass communication (print and online journalism, public relations and advertising, and radio and television) and the Bachelor of Fine Arts degree with a concentration in visual and performing arts. It also offers the Bachelor of Science degree with concentrations in behavioral analysis, criminal justice, political science (pre-law, public administration and international and comparative politics), and sociology and the Bachelor of Social Work degree with a concentration in social work.

Accreditation
CLASS is accredited by the Commission on Colleges of the Southern Association of Colleges and Schools to offer bachelor's degrees as well as the Master of Public Administration, the Master of Science in Urban Studies and Planning and Master of Social Work. The bachelor's degree and Master of Social Work programs are accredited by the Council on Social Work Education. The MPA is accredited by the National Association of Schools of Public Affairs and Administration. The Mass Communications Department is accredited by the Accrediting Council on Education in Journalism and Mass Communications (ACEJMC).

Departments and degrees
Departments
Department of Liberal Arts
Department of Mass Communications
Department of Political Science, and Public Affairs
Department of Social and Behavioral Sciences
Department of Social Work
Undergraduate degrees
Bachelor of Arts in Africana studies, English language and literature, history, mass communications, and homeland security and emergency management
Bachelor of Fine Arts in visual and performing arts
Bachelor of Science in behavioral analysis, political science, criminal justice, and sociology
Graduate degrees
Master of Public Administration
Master of Science in Urban Studies and Planning
Master of Social Work

References

External links
 Official website

College of Liberal Arts and Social Sciences
Liberal arts colleges at universities in the United States